Teresa is a common feminine name.

Teresa, Theresa, Therese, or Thérèse may also refer to:

People
One of several saints named Teresa

Places
Teresa, Rizal, a municipality in the Philippine province of Rizal
Theresa, New York, a town in the United States
Theresa (village), New York, a village within the town
Theresa (town), Wisconsin, a town in the United States
Theresa, Wisconsin, a village within the town
Teresa, Castellón, a municipality in Spain
Teresa, Greater Poland Voivodeship, west-central Poland
Teressa (Nicobar Islands), one of the Nicobar Islands
Thérèse Island, in the Seychelles

Film and television
Teresa (1951 film), an American film directed by Fred Zinnemann
Thérèse (film), a 1986 French film by Alain Cavalier about the life of Saint Thérèse of Lisieux
Teresa (1987 film), an Italian film directed by Dino Risi
Teresa (2010 film), an Equatoguinean film directed by Thato Rantao Mwosa
Thérèse Desqueyroux (2012 film), a 2012 film by Claude Miller, also known as Thérèse
Therese (2013 film), an American erotic thriller based on the Zola novel Thérèse Raquin
Teresa (1959 TV series), a Mexican soap opera on Telesistema Mexicano, starring Maricruz Olivier as Teresa Martínez
Teresa (1989 TV series), a Mexican soap opera on El Canal de las Estrellas, starring Salma Hayek as Teresa Martínez
Teresa (2010 TV series), a Mexican soap opera from 2010 to 2011 on Televisa in Mexico and Univision in the U.S., starring Angelique Boyer as Teresa Chávez Aguirre

Music
Thérésa (singer) (1837–1913), French singer
Thérèse (opera), a 1907 opera by Jules Massenet
Thérèse – Vivre d'amour, a 2013 concept album of poems by St. Thérèse of Lisieux, with music composed by French musician Grégoire
"Teresa" (song), a song by Joe Dolan that topped the Irish singles chart in 1969
"Teresa", a song by Dick Haymes and The Andrews Sisters
"Teresa", a song by Eddie Cochran from The Very Best of Eddie Cochran

Novels
Teresa (novel), an 1896 novel by Neera
Theresa (novel), a 1928 novel by Arthur Schnitzler
Teresa: A Journey Out of Time, a 1961 novel by Frank Baker

Other uses
Teresa, a Spanish women's magazine published during the Franco rule
, a United States Navy cargo ship in commission from 1918 to 1919
Teresa (Barbie), a fashion doll who is a fictional friend to Barbie

See also

 
 
Teressa (disambiguation)
Therese (disambiguation)
Therese's shrew (Crocidura theresae), species of mammal in the family Soricidae
Lac-Sainte-Thérèse, Ontario
Sainte-Thérèse, Quebec
Val Thérèse, Ontario
Terezín, a place in the Czech Republic
Saint Teresa (disambiguation)
Santa Teresa (disambiguation)